Five Knuckle Shuffle may refer to:

 Signature move of professional wrestler John Cena
"We Hate You (Little Girls)/Five Knuckle Shuffle", a single by Throbbing Gristle
 Masturbation, in British slang